French Naval Aviation (often abbreviated in French to:  (contraction of ), or , or more simply ) is the naval air arm of the French Navy. Born as a fusion of aircraft carrier squadrons and the naval patrol air force, the Aéronavale was created in 1912. The force is under the command of a flag officer officially titled Admiral of Naval Aviation (ALAVIA) with his headquarters at Toulon naval base. It has a strength of around 6,800 military and civilian personnel. It operates from four airbases in Metropolitan France and several detachments in foreign countries or French overseas territories. Carrier-borne pilots of the French Navy do their initial training at Salon-de-Provence Air Base after which they undergo their carrier qualification with the US Navy.

Aircraft inventory

|-
| Bréguet Atlantique II || France || Turboprop || ASW ||  || 22 ||  || 
|-
| Dassault Falcon 10 M || France || Jet || Utility ||  || 6 ||  || 
|-
| Dassault Falcon 50 M || France || Jet || Patrol ||  || 8 ||  || 
|-
| Dassault Falcon 200 Guardian || France || Jet || Patrol ||  || 5 ||  || 
|-
| Dassault Rafale M || France || Jet || Multirole ||  || 42 ||  || 
|- 
| Embraer EMB 121 Xingu || Brazil || Turboprop|| Utility ||  || 11 ||  || 
|-
| Eurocopter AS365 Dauphin || France || Rotorcraft || SAR ||  || 15 ||  || 
|-
| Eurocopter AS565 Panther || France || Rotorcraft || Utility ||  || 16 ||  || 
|-
| Grumman E-2C Hawkeye || USA || Turboprop || AEW&C ||  || 3 ||  || 
|-
| Mudry CAP 10 || France || Propeller || Trainer ||  || 7 ||  || 
|-
| NHIndustries NH90 Caïman Marine || France || Rotorcraft || ASW/SAR ||  || 27 ||  || 
|-
| Airbus Helicopters H160 || France || Rotorcraft || ASW/SAR ||  || 6 ||  || 
|}

Structure

Immediately after the end of World War II, the Aeronavale only had Supermarine Seafire Mk.III (Flottille 1F) and Douglas SBD Dauntless dive bombers (Flotilles 3F et 4F).

Components
The flight personnel of the French Navy falls into three categories: fighter aviation, fixed-wing aviation and helicopter aviation.

Operationally the French Naval Aviation has four components:
 Embarqued Air Group (Le Groupe aérien embarqué) of the aircraft carrier : Rafale M, E-2C Hawkeye
 Naval Patrol and Maritime Surveillance Aviation (l'Aviation de patrouille et de surveillance maritime): Atlantique 2, Falcon 50, Falcon 200
 Shipborne and Shore-based Helicopters (Les hélicoptères embarqués et basés à terre): Dauphin, Panther, Caïman Marine
 Support Aviation (l'Aviation de soutien): Falcon 10, EMB-121 Xingu, SR20, Cap-10, Dauphin, EC120 Colibri

Units
Operational squadrons are known as Flottilles and normally consist of 12 aircraft :
1F to 10F are carrier based anti-submarine squadrons
11F to 20F are fighter and attack squadrons
21F to 30F are maritime patrol squadrons
31F to 39F are helicopter squadrons
Shore-based training and transport squadrons are known as Escadrilles de Servitude :
1S to 19S are communications squadrons
20S to 29S are helicopters squadrons
50S to 59S are training squadrons

Retired aircraft 
This is a list of retired aircraft that has flown with French Naval Aviation.
 Amiot AAC.1 (Junkers Ju 52)
 Avro Anson
 Avro Lancaster Mk.VII
 Beechcraft SNB-5/JRB-4
 Blanchard Brd.1 HB3
 Blériot-SPAD S.42
 Bloch MB.151 C1
 Borel-Odier T BO-2
 Breguet BRE.14B2/A2
 Breguet BRE.19 B2

 Bréguet 521 Bizerte
 Bréguet 1050 Alizé
 Bréguet 1150 Atlantic
 CAMS 30E
 CAMS.37A/37²/37.11/Lia
 CAMS 46 Et2
 CAMS 55.1/55.2/55.6/55.10
 Caudron Cau 59 ET2
 Caudron C635 Simoun
 Caudron C.445 Goéland

 Canadian Car & Foundry Harvard II
 Chance Vought F4U-7/AU-1 Corsair
 Consolidated PBY-5 Catalina
 Consolidated PB4Y-2 Privateer
 Coutant RMC Type 17
 Curtiss SB2C4/SB2C5 Helldiver
 Dassault Étendard IVM/P
 Dassault MD 312 Flamant
 Dassault Super Étendard
 De Havilland 100 Vampire Mk.V
 Dewoitine 7 C1
 Dewoitine D.373/D.376
 Dewoitine D.510
 Dewoitine D.520
 Donnet-Denhaut 140/150 hp 
 Donnet-Denhaut 160 hp
 Donnet-Denhaut 200 HP HS Triplace/RR/BB
 Donnet-Denhaut 275hp
 Donnet-Denhaut bimoteur
 Dornier Do 24T
 Douglas SBD-5 Dauntless
 Douglas C-47D Dakota
 Farman Lévy HB2 450 hp
 Farman F60 Torp Goliath/F65
 Farman F.165/F.166/F.168 Torp
 Farman F.223.4
 FBA Type C
 FBA Type H 
 FBA Type S
 FBA type 14 HE2 
 FBA.17HL1/HL2/HMT2/HE2
 FBA.19HMB2 
 Fouga CM.175 Zéphyr
 Georges Lévy 280 HB.2
 Gourdou Leseurre ET1 Type 22
 Gourdou Leseurre LGL.32
 Gourdou Leseurre GL.810/811/812/813 HY
 Gourdou Leseurre GL.832 HY
 Grumman F6F-5 Hellcat
 Grumman TBM-3S/E/W/UT Avenger
 Grumman JRF-5 Goose
 Hanriot HD.2 C.1
 Hanriot HD.3 C.2
 Hanriot HD.14 E.2
 Hanriot HD.17 E.2
 Hanriot H.41
 Junkers Ju 188
 Latécoère 290
 Latécoère 298
 Latham 43 HB.3
 Levasseur PL.4 R3b
 Levasseur PL.5 C2b
 Levasseur PL.7 T2B2b
 Levasseur PL.10 R3b/PL.101 R3b
 Levasseur PL.14 Tb2B2
 Levasseur PL.15 T2B2
 Lévy Besson 200 hp
 Lioré et Olivier LeO.7.3
 Lioré et Olivier LeO.20 Bn3
 Lioré et Olivier H.13/H.136
 Lioré et Olivier H.43
 Lioré et Olivier H.193
 Lioré et Olivier H.257 Bis/H258
 Lockheed P2V-1 Ventura
 Lockheed P2V-6/7 Neptune

 Loire 130 C.l
 Loire 210
 LTV/Vought F-8E(FN) Crusader
 Martin 167-A3
 Martin P5M-2 Marlin
 Maurice Farman Type 1910
 Morane Saulnier MoS.130 Et2
 Morane Saulnier MoS.149 Ep2
 Morane Saulnier MS.225 C1
 Morane Saulnier MS.230 Et2
 Morane Saulnier MS.406 C1
 Morane Saulnier MS.500/MS.502 Criquet
 Morane Saulnier MS.733 Alcyon

 Morane Saulnier MS760 Paris
 Nieuport IV.H
 Nieuport VI.H
 Nieuport 12
 Nieuport N.21/N.23
 Nieuport NiD.62 C1/NiD.622 C1
 Nord 262 Frégate
 North American NAA.57 P2
 North American SNJ-3/4/5
 Piper PA-31 Navajo
 Potez 25 A2/TOE
 Potez 452
 Potez 567
 Potez 631 C3
 Salmson Sal.2 A2
 SCAN 20
 Short Sunderland Mk.III/V
 SNCAC/Farman NC.470
 SNCAC NC.701/NC.702 Martinet
 SNCAN N.1001/N.1002 Pingouin
 SNCAN N.1101 Noralpha
 SNCAN N.1402 Noroit
 SNCAN SV.4C Stampe
 SNCAO/Loire-Nieuport LN.401/LN.411
 SNCASE R.82 Romano
 SNCASE Leo.451
 SNCASE SE.161 Languedoc/Bloch MB.160
 SNCASE Aquilon
 SNCASO/Bloch MB.175
 SNCASO SO.94/95 Corse
 SNCASO SO.30P Bretagne
 SOCATA MS.880 Rallye
 Sopwith Sop.1 A2
 Sopwith Baby/130hp Clerget
 Sopwith Triplan C.1
 SPAD S.VII C.1

 SPAD S.XIII C.1
 SPAD XIV Canon
 Stinson 105
 Supermarine Seafire Mk.III/IX/XV
 Supermarine Sea Otter
 Supermarine Walrus
 Tampier T.4
 Taylorcraft L-2
 Tellier Canon 200 hp
 Tellier 200 hp
 Tellier 350Hp
 Tellier BM 400 hp

 Villiers Vil.2AM C.2
 Vickers Wellington 
 Voisin 13,5m
 Voisin Canard
 Voisin III
 Voisin VIII
 Vought V.156-F
 Wibault Wib.74 C.1

Helicopters and autogyros
 Aérospatiale Alouette II
 Aérospatiale Super Frelon
 Bell 47
 LeO C-30
 Lynx Mk.4(FN)
 Piasecki H-21C
 Piasecki HUP-2
 Sikorsky H-51
 Sikorsky S-55
 Sikorsky S-58
 Sud-Aviation HSS-1

See also
Edouard Guillaud

References & notes

External links

 French Fleet Air Arm, about French naval aviation.
 (fr) Association pour la Recherche de Documentation sur l'Histoire de l'Aéronautique Navale (ARDHAN), Association for Documentation Research on the History of French Naval Aviation.